Over the Wall may refer to:

 Over the Wall (charity), a charity providing camps for seriously ill children in the UK
 "Over the Wall" (song), a single by Echo & the Bunnymen
 Over the Wall (band), a Glasgow-based pop band
 Over the Wall (film), a 1938 film
 Over the Wall (short film), a 1944 film
 Over the Wall (novel), a 2000 novel by John H. Ritter

See also
Over the Garden Wall (disambiguation) 
The Wall (disambiguation)